Mohit Ab (also Romanized as Moḩīţ Āb; also known as Moḩīţā) is a village in Pol Beh Pain Rural District, Simakan District, Jahrom County, Fars Province, Iran. At the 2006 census, its population was 190, in 35 families.

References 

Populated places in Jahrom County